This is a list of the bird species recorded in Eritrea. The avifauna of Eritrea include a total of 587 species.

This list's taxonomic treatment (designation and sequence of orders, families and species) and nomenclature (common and scientific names) follow the conventions of The Clements Checklist of Birds of the World, 2022 edition. The family accounts at the beginning of each heading reflect this taxonomy, as do the species counts found in each family account. Accidental species are included in the total species count for Eritrea.

The following tags have been used to highlight several categories, but not all species fall into one of these categories. Those that do not are commonly occurring native species.

 (A) Accidental - a species that rarely or accidentally occurs in Eritrea
 (E) Endemic - a species endemic to Eritrea
 (I) Introduced - a species introduced to Eritrea as a consequence, direct or indirect, of human actions

Ostriches
Order: StruthioniformesFamily: Struthionidae

The ostrich is a flightless bird native to Africa. It is the largest living species of bird. It is distinctive in its appearance, with a long neck and legs and the ability to run at high speeds.

Common ostrich, Struthio camelus

Ducks, geese, and waterfowl
Order: AnseriformesFamily: Anatidae

Anatidae includes the ducks and most duck-like waterfowl, such as geese and swans. These birds are adapted to an aquatic existence with webbed feet, flattened bills, and feathers that are excellent at shedding water due to an oily coating.

White-faced whistling-duck, Dendrocygna viduata (A)
Fulvous whistling-duck, Dendrocygna bicolor
Knob-billed duck, Sarkidiornis melanotos (A)
Egyptian goose, Alopochen aegyptiacus
Ruddy shelduck, Tadorna ferruginea (A)
Garganey, Spatula querquedula
Northern shoveler, Spatula clypeata
Gadwall, Mareca strepera
Eurasian wigeon, Mareca penelope
Yellow-billed duck, Anas undulata (A)
Mallard, Anas platyrhynchos (A)
Red-billed duck, Anas erythrorhyncha (A)
Northern pintail, Anas acuta
Green-winged teal, Anas crecca
Southern pochard, Netta erythrophthalma
Common pochard, Aythya ferina
Ferruginous duck, Aythya nyroca
Tufted duck, Aythya fuligula
Maccoa duck, Oxyura maccoa (A)

Guineafowl
Order: GalliformesFamily: Numididae

Guineafowl are a group of African, seed-eating, ground-nesting birds that resemble partridges, but with featherless heads and spangled grey plumage. 

Helmeted guineafowl, Numida meleagris

New World quail
Order: GalliformesFamily: Odontophoridae

Despite their family's common name, this species and one other are native to Africa.

 Stone partridge, Ptilopachus petrosus

Pheasants, grouse, and allies
Order: GalliformesFamily: Phasianidae

The Phasianidae are a family of terrestrial birds which consists of quails, snowcocks, francolins, spurfowls, tragopans, monals, pheasants, peafowls and jungle fowls. In general, they are plump (although they vary in size) and have broad, relatively short wings.

Orange River francolin, Scleroptila gutturalis
Common quail, Coturnix coturnix
Harlequin quail, Coturnix delegorguei
Erckel's francolin, Pternistis erckelii
Clapperton's francolin, Pternistis clappertoni
Yellow-necked spurfowl, Pternistis leucoscepus

Flamingos
Order: PhoenicopteriformesFamily: Phoenicopteridae

Flamingos filter-feed on shellfish and algae. Their oddly shaped beaks are specially adapted to separate mud and silt from the food they consume and, uniquely, are used upside-down.

Greater flamingo, Phoenicopterus roseus
Lesser flamingo, Phoenicopterus minor

Grebes
Order: PodicipediformesFamily: Podicipedidae

Grebes are small to medium-large freshwater diving birds. They have lobed toes and are excellent swimmers and divers. However, they have their feet placed far back on the body, making them quite ungainly on land.

Little grebe, Tachybaptus ruficollis
Great crested grebe, Podiceps cristatus

Pigeons and doves
Order: ColumbiformesFamily: Columbidae

Pigeons and doves are stout-bodied birds with short necks and short slender bills with a fleshy cere.

Rock pigeon, Columba livia
Speckled pigeon, Columba guinea
White-collared pigeon, Columba albitorques
Rameron pigeon, Columba arquatrix (A)
Lemon dove, Columba larvata
European turtle-dove, Streptopelia turtur
Dusky turtle-dove, Streptopelia lugens
African collared-dove, Streptopelia roseogrisea
Mourning collared-dove, Streptopelia decipiens
Red-eyed dove, Streptopelia semitorquata
Ring-necked dove, Streptopelia capicola
Vinaceous dove, Streptopelia vinacea
Laughing dove, Streptopelia senegalensis
Black-billed wood-dove, Turtur abyssinicus
Blue-spotted wood-dove, Turtur afer
Namaqua dove, Oena capensis
Bruce's green-pigeon, Treron waalia

Sandgrouse
Order: PterocliformesFamily: Pteroclidae

Sandgrouse have small, pigeon like heads and necks, but sturdy compact bodies. They have long pointed wings and sometimes tails and a fast direct flight. Flocks fly to watering holes at dawn and dusk. Their legs are feathered down to the toes.

Chestnut-bellied sandgrouse, Pterocles exustus
Spotted sandgrouse, Pterocles senegallus
Yellow-throated sandgrouse, Pterocles gutturalis
Lichtenstein's sandgrouse, Pterocles lichtensteinii
Four-banded sandgrouse, Pterocles quadricinctus

Bustards
Order: OtidiformesFamily: Otididae

Bustards are large terrestrial birds mainly associated with dry open country and steppes in the Old World. They are omnivorous and nest on the ground. They walk steadily on strong legs and big toes, pecking for food as they go. They have long broad wings with "fingered" wingtips and striking patterns in flight. Many have interesting mating displays.

Arabian bustard, Ardeotis arabs
Heuglin's bustard, Neotis heuglinii (A)
White-bellied bustard, Eupodotis senegalensis
Black-bellied bustard, Lissotis melanogaster

Turacos
Order: MusophagiformesFamily: Musophagidae

The turacos, plantain eaters and go-away-birds make up the bird family Musophagidae. They are medium-sized arboreal birds. The turacos and plantain eaters are brightly coloured, usually in blue, green or purple. The go-away birds are mostly grey and white.

White-cheeked turaco, Tauraco leucotis
White-bellied go-away-bird, Corythaixoides leucogaster (A)
Eastern plantain-eater, Crinifer zonurus

Cuckoos
Order: CuculiformesFamily: Cuculidae

The family Cuculidae includes cuckoos, roadrunners and anis. These birds are of variable size with slender bodies, long tails and strong legs. The Old World cuckoos are brood parasites.

Blue-headed coucal, Centropus monachus
White-browed coucal, Centropus superciliosus
Great spotted cuckoo, Clamator glandarius
Levaillant's cuckoo, Clamator levaillantii
Pied cuckoo, Clamator jacobinus
Dideric cuckoo, Chrysococcyx caprius
Klaas's cuckoo, Chrysococcyx klaas
African emerald cuckoo, Chrysococcyx cupreus
Black cuckoo, Cuculus clamosus
African cuckoo, Cuculus gularis
Common cuckoo, Cuculus canorus

Nightjars and allies
Order: CaprimulgiformesFamily: Caprimulgidae

Nightjars are medium-sized nocturnal birds that usually nest on the ground. They have long wings, short legs and very short bills. Most have small feet, of little use for walking, and long pointed wings. Their soft plumage is camouflaged to resemble bark or leaves. 

Standard-winged nightjar, Caprimulgus longipennis
Eurasian nightjar, Caprimulgus europaeus
Sombre nightjar, Caprimulgus fraenatus
Egyptian nightjar, Caprimulgus aegyptius (A)
Nubian nightjar, Caprimulgus nubicus
Montane nightjar, Caprimulgus poliocephalus
Plain nightjar, Caprimulgus inornatus
Long-tailed nightjar, Caprimulgus climacurus

Swifts
Order: CaprimulgiformesFamily: Apodidae

Swifts are small birds which spend the majority of their lives flying. These birds have very short legs and never settle voluntarily on the ground, perching instead only on vertical surfaces. Many swifts have long swept-back wings which resemble a crescent or boomerang. 

Alpine swift, Apus melba
Mottled swift, Apus aequatorialis
Common swift, Apus apus
Nyanza swift, Apus niansae
Little swift, Apus affinis
White-rumped swift, Apus caffer
African palm-swift, Cypsiurus parvus

Rails, gallinules and coots
Order: GruiformesFamily: Rallidae

Rallidae is a large family of small to medium-sized birds which includes the rails, crakes, coots and gallinules. Typically they inhabit dense vegetation in damp environments near lakes, swamps or rivers. In general they are shy and secretive birds, making them difficult to observe. Most species have strong legs and long toes which are well adapted to soft uneven surfaces. They tend to have short, rounded wings and to be weak fliers.

Corn crake, Crex crex (A)
Rouget's rail, Rougetius rougetii
Spotted crake, Porzana porzana
Lesser moorhen, Paragallinula angulata (A)
Eurasian moorhen, Gallinula chloropus
Red-knobbed coot, Fulica cristata
Allen's gallinule, Porphyrio alleni (A)
African swamphen, Porphyrio madagascariensis (A)
Little crake, Zapornia parva (A)

Cranes
Order: GruiformesFamily: Gruidae

Cranes are large, long-legged and long-necked birds. Unlike the similar-looking but unrelated herons, cranes fly with necks outstretched, not pulled back. Most have elaborate and noisy courting displays or "dances".

Demoiselle crane, Anthropoides virgo (A)
Common crane, Grus grus (A)

Thick-knees
Order: CharadriiformesFamily: Burhinidae

The thick-knees are a group of largely tropical waders in the family Burhinidae. They are found worldwide within the tropical zone, with some species also breeding in temperate Europe and Australia. They are medium to large waders with strong black or yellow-black bills, large yellow eyes and cryptic plumage. Despite being classed as waders, most species have a preference for arid or semi-arid habitats. 

Eurasian thick-knee, Burhinus oedicnemus
Senegal thick-knee, Burhinus senegalensis
Spotted thick-knee, Burhinus capensis

Egyptian plover
Order: CharadriiformesFamily: Pluvianidae

The Egyptian plover is found across equatorial Africa and along the Nile River.

Egyptian plover, Pluvianus aegyptius

Stilts and avocets
Order: CharadriiformesFamily: Recurvirostridae

Recurvirostridae is a family of large wading birds, which includes the avocets and stilts. The avocets have long legs and long up-curved bills. The stilts have extremely long legs and long, thin, straight bills. 

Black-winged stilt, Himantopus himantopus
Pied avocet, Recurvirostra avosetta (A)

Oystercatchers
Order: CharadriiformesFamily: Haematopodidae

The oystercatchers are large and noisy plover-like birds, with strong bills used for smashing or prising open molluscs. 

Eurasian oystercatcher, Haematopus ostralegus

Plovers and lapwings
Order: CharadriiformesFamily: Charadriidae

The family Charadriidae includes the plovers, dotterels and lapwings. They are small to medium-sized birds with compact bodies, short, thick necks and long, usually pointed, wings. They are found in open country worldwide, mostly in habitats near water. There are 66 species worldwide and 15 species which occur in Eritrea.

Black-bellied plover, Pluvialis squatarola
Pacific golden-plover, Pluvialis fulva
Spur-winged lapwing, Vanellus spinosus
Black-headed lapwing, Vanellus tectus
Black-winged lapwing, Vanellus melanopterus
Wattled lapwing, Vanellus senegallus
Sociable lapwing, Vanellus gregarius 
White-tailed lapwing, Vanellus leucurus (A)
Lesser sand-plover, Charadrius mongolus
Greater sand-plover, Charadrius leschenaultii
Caspian plover, Charadrius asiaticus
Kittlitz's plover, Charadrius pecuarius (A)
Kentish plover, Charadrius alexandrinus
Common ringed plover, Charadrius hiaticula
Little ringed plover, Charadrius dubius
Three-banded plover, Charadrius tricollaris
White-fronted plover, Charadrius marginatus (A)

Painted-snipes
Order: CharadriiformesFamily: Rostratulidae

Painted-snipes are short-legged, long-billed birds similar in shape to the true snipes, but more brightly coloured.

Greater painted-snipe, Rostratula benghalensis (A)

Jacanas
Order: CharadriiformesFamily: Jacanidae

The jacanas are a group of waders found throughout the tropics. They are identifiable by their huge feet and claws which enable them to walk on floating vegetation in the shallow lakes that are their preferred habitat.

African jacana, Actophilornis africanus (A)

Sandpipers and allies
Order: CharadriiformesFamily: Scolopacidae

Scolopacidae is a large diverse family of small to medium-sized shorebirds including the sandpipers, curlews, godwits, shanks, tattlers, woodcocks, snipes, dowitchers and phalaropes. The majority of these species eat small invertebrates picked out of the mud or soil. Variation in length of legs and bills enables multiple species to feed in the same habitat, particularly on the coast, without direct competition for food.

Whimbrel, Numenius phaeopus
Slender-billed curlew, Numenius tenuirostris (A)
Eurasian curlew, Numenius arquata
Bar-tailed godwit, Limosa lapponica
Black-tailed godwit, Limosa limosa
Ruddy turnstone, Arenaria interpres
Ruff, Calidris pugnax
Broad-billed sandpiper, Calidris falcinellus
Curlew sandpiper, Calidris ferruginea
Temminck's stint, Calidris temminckii
Sanderling, Calidris alba
Dunlin, Calidris alpina
Little stint, Calidris minuta
Jack snipe, Lymnocryptes minimus (A)
Great snipe, Gallinago media (A)
Common snipe, Gallinago gallinago
African snipe, Gallinago nigripennis
Terek sandpiper, Xenus cinereus
Red-necked phalarope, Phalaropus lobatus (A)
Common sandpiper, Actitis hypoleucos
Green sandpiper, Tringa ochropus
Spotted redshank, Tringa erythropus
Common greenshank, Tringa nebularia
Marsh sandpiper, Tringa stagnatilis
Wood sandpiper, Tringa glareola
Common redshank, Tringa totanus

Buttonquail
Order: CharadriiformesFamily: Turnicidae

The buttonquail are small, drab, running birds which resemble the true quails. The female is the brighter of the sexes and initiates courtship. The male incubates the eggs and tends the young.

Small buttonquail, Turnix sylvatica

Crab-plover
Order: CharadriiformesFamily: Dromadidae

The crab-plover is related to the waders. It resembles a plover but with very long grey legs and a strong heavy black bill similar to a tern. It has black-and-white plumage, a long neck, partially webbed feet and a bill designed for eating crabs.

Crab-plover, Dromas ardeola

Pratincoles and coursers
Order: CharadriiformesFamily: Glareolidae

Glareolidae is a family of wading birds comprising the pratincoles, which have short legs, long pointed wings and long forked tails, and the coursers, which have long legs, short wings and long, pointed bills which curve downwards. 

Cream-colored courser, Cursorius cursor
Somali courser, Cursorius somalensis (A)
Temminck's courser, Cursorius temminckii
Bronze-winged courser, Rhinoptilus chalcopterus (A)
Collared pratincole, Glareola pratincola
Black-winged pratincole, Glareola nordmanni (A)

Skuas and jaegers
Order: CharadriiformesFamily: Stercorariidae

The family Stercorariidae are, in general, medium to large birds, typically with grey or brown plumage, often with white markings on the wings. They nest on the ground in temperate and arctic regions and are long-distance migrants.

Pomarine jaeger, Stercorarius pomarinus (A)
Parasitic jaeger, Stercorarius parasiticus (A)

Gulls, terns, and skimmers
Order: CharadriiformesFamily: Laridae

Laridae is a family of medium to large seabirds, the gulls, terns, and skimmers. Gulls are typically grey or white, often with black markings on the head or wings. They have stout, longish bills and webbed feet. Terns are a group of generally medium to large seabirds typically with grey or white plumage, often with black markings on the head. Most terns hunt fish by diving but some pick insects off the surface of fresh water. Terns are generally long-lived birds, with several species known to live in excess of 30 years. Skimmers are a small family of tropical tern-like birds. They have an elongated lower mandible which they use to feed by flying low over the water surface and skimming the water for small fish.

Slender-billed gull, Chroicocephalus genei
Black-headed gull, Chroicocephalus ridibundus
White-eyed gull, Ichthyaetus leucophthalmus
Sooty gull, Ichthyaetus hemprichii
Pallas's gull, Ichthyaetus ichthyaetus (A)
Caspian gull, Larus cachinnans
Armenian gull, Larus armenicus (A)
Lesser black-backed gull, Larus fuscus
Brown noddy, Anous stolidus
Sooty tern, Onychoprion fuscatus (A)
Bridled tern, Onychoprion anaethetus
Little tern, Sternula albifrons (A)
Saunders's tern, Sternula saundersi
Gull-billed tern, Gelochelidon nilotica
Caspian tern, Hydroprogne caspia
Black tern, Chlidonias niger (A)
White-winged tern, Chlidonias leucopterus
Common tern, Sterna hirundo
White-cheeked tern, Sterna repressa
Great crested tern, Thalasseus bergii
Sandwich tern, Thalasseus sandvicensis
Lesser crested tern, Thalasseus bengalensis
African skimmer, Rynchops flavirostris (A)

Tropicbirds
Order: PhaethontiformesFamily: Phaethontidae

Tropicbirds are slender white birds of tropical oceans, with exceptionally long central tail feathers. Their heads and long wings have black markings. There are 3 species worldwide and 1 species which occurs in Eritrea.

Red-billed tropicbird, Phaethon aethereus

Southern storm-petrels
Order: ProcellariiformesFamily: Oceanitidae

The southern storm-petrels are relatives of the petrels and are the smallest seabirds. They feed on planktonic crustaceans and small fish picked from the surface, typically while hovering. The flight is fluttering and sometimes bat-like.

Wilson's storm-petrel, Oceanites oceanicus

Shearwaters and petrels
Order: ProcellariiformesFamily: Procellariidae

The procellariids are the main group of medium-sized "true petrels", characterised by united nostrils with medium septum and a long outer functional primary.

Jouanin's petrel, Bulweria fallax (A)
Persian shearwater, Puffinus persicus (A)

Storks
Order: CiconiiformesFamily: Ciconiidae

Storks are large, long-legged, long-necked, wading birds with long, stout bills. Storks are mute, but bill-clattering is an important mode of communication at the nest. Their nests can be large and may be reused for many years.

African openbill, Anastomus lamelligerus (A)
Black stork, Ciconia nigra
Abdim's stork, Ciconia abdimii
African woolly-necked stork, Ciconia microscelis
White stork, Ciconia ciconia
Saddle-billed stork, Ephippiorhynchus senegalensis
Marabou stork, Leptoptilos crumenifer
Yellow-billed stork, Mycteria ibis

Frigatebirds
Order: SuliformesFamily: Fregatidae

Frigatebirds are large seabirds usually found over tropical oceans. They are large, black-and-white or completely black, with long wings and deeply forked tails. The males have coloured inflatable throat pouches. They do not swim or walk and cannot take off from a flat surface. Having the largest wingspan-to-body-weight ratio of any bird, they are essentially aerial, able to stay aloft for more than a week.

Lesser frigatebird, Fregata ariel (A)

Boobies and gannets
Order: SuliformesFamily: Sulidae

The sulids comprise the gannets and boobies. Both groups are medium to large coastal seabirds that plunge-dive for fish.

Masked booby, Sula dactylatra
Brown booby, Sula leucogaster
Red-footed booby, Sula sula (A)

Darters
Order: SuliformesFamily: Anhingidae

Darters are often called "snake-birds" because of their long thin neck, which gives a snake-like appearance when they swim with their bodies submerged. The males have black and dark-brown plumage, an erectile crest on the nape and a larger bill than the female. The females have much paler plumage especially on the neck and underparts. The darters have completely webbed feet and their legs are short and set far back on the body. Their plumage is somewhat permeable, like that of cormorants, and they spread their wings to dry after diving.

African darter, Anhinga rufa

Cormorants and shags
Order: SuliformesFamily: Phalacrocoracidae

Phalacrocoracidae is a family of medium to large coastal, fish-eating seabirds that includes cormorants and shags. Plumage colouration varies, with the majority having mainly dark plumage, some species being black-and-white and a few being colourful.

Long-tailed cormorant, Microcarbo africanus
Great cormorant, Phalacrocorax carbo (A)
Socotra cormorant, Phalacrocorax nigrogularis

Pelicans
Order: PelecaniformesFamily: Pelecanidae

Pelicans are large water birds with a distinctive pouch under their beak. As with other members of the order Pelecaniformes, they have webbed feet with four toes.

Great white pelican, Pelecanus onocrotalus (A)
Pink-backed pelican, Pelecanus rufescens

Hammerkop
Order: PelecaniformesFamily: Scopidae

The hammerkop is a medium-sized bird with a long shaggy crest. The shape of its head with a curved bill and crest at the back is reminiscent of a hammer, hence its name. Its plumage is drab-brown all over.

Hamerkop, Scopus umbretta

Herons, egrets, and bitterns
Order: PelecaniformesFamily: Ardeidae

The family Ardeidae contains the bitterns, herons and egrets. Herons and egrets are medium to large wading birds with long necks and legs. Bitterns tend to be shorter necked and more wary. Members of Ardeidae fly with their necks retracted, unlike other long-necked birds such as storks, ibises and spoonbills.

Great bittern, Botaurus stellaris (A)
Little bittern, Ixobrychus minutus
Gray heron, Ardea cinerea
Black-headed heron, Ardea melanocephala
Goliath heron, Ardea goliath
Purple heron, Ardea purpurea
Great egret, Ardea alba
Intermediate egret, Ardea intermedia (A)
Little egret, Egretta garzetta
Western reef-heron, Egretta gularis
Cattle egret, Bubulcus ibis
Squacco heron, Ardeola ralloides
Striated heron, Butorides striata
Black-crowned night-heron, Nycticorax nycticorax
White-backed night-heron, Gorsachius leuconotus (A)

Ibises and spoonbills
Order: PelecaniformesFamily: Threskiornithidae

Threskiornithidae is a family of large terrestrial and wading birds which includes the ibises and spoonbills. They have long, broad wings with 11 primary and about 20 secondary feathers. They are strong fliers and despite their size and weight, very capable soarers.

Glossy ibis, Plegadis falcinellus
African sacred ibis, Threskiornis aethiopicus
Northern bald ibis, Geronticus eremita
Wattled ibis, Bostrychia carunculata
Eurasian spoonbill, Platalea leucorodia
African spoonbill, Platalea alba

Secretarybird
Order: AccipitriformesFamily: Sagittariidae

The secretary-bird is a bird of prey in the order Falconiformes but is easily distinguished from other raptors by its long crane-like legs.

Secretarybird, Sagittarius serpentarius

Osprey
Order: AccipitriformesFamily: Pandionidae

The family Pandionidae contains only one species, the osprey. The osprey is a medium-large raptor which is a specialist fish-eater with a worldwide distribution.

Osprey, Pandion haliaetus

Hawks, eagles, and kites 
Order: AccipitriformesFamily: Accipitridae

Accipitridae is a family of birds of prey, which includes hawks, eagles, kites, harriers and Old World vultures. These birds have powerful hooked beaks for tearing flesh from their prey, strong legs, powerful talons and keen eyesight.

Black-winged kite, Elanus caeruleus
Scissor-tailed kite, Chelictinia riocourii (A)
African harrier-hawk, Polyboroides typus
Bearded vulture, Gypaetus barbatus
Egyptian vulture, Neophron percnopterus
European honey-buzzard, Pernis apivorus
White-headed vulture, Trigonoceps occipitalis
Lappet-faced vulture, Torgos tracheliotos
Hooded vulture, Necrosyrtes monachus
White-backed vulture, Gyps africanus
Rüppell's griffon, Gyps rueppelli
Eurasian griffon, Gyps fulvus
Bateleur, Terathopius ecaudatus
Short-toed snake-eagle, Circaetus gallicus
Beaudouin's snake-eagle, Circaetus beaudouini (A)
Black-chested snake-eagle, Circaetus pectoralis (A)
Brown snake-eagle, Circaetus cinereus
Martial eagle, Polemaetus bellicosus
Long-crested eagle, Lophaetus occipitalis
Lesser spotted eagle, Clanga pomarina (A)
Greater spotted eagle, Clanga clanga
Wahlberg's eagle, Hieraaetus wahlbergi
Booted eagle, Hieraaetus pennatus
Tawny eagle, Aquila rapax
Steppe eagle, Aquila nipalensis
Imperial eagle, Aquila heliaca (A)
Verreaux's eagle, Aquila verreauxii
Bonelli's eagle, Aquila fasciata (A)
African hawk-eagle, Aquila spilogaster'
Dark chanting-goshawk, Melierax metabatesGabar goshawk, Micronisus gabarGrasshopper buzzard, Butastur rufipennisEurasian marsh-harrier, Circus aeruginosusPallid harrier, Circus macrourusMontagu's harrier, Circus pygargusAfrican goshawk, Accipiter tachiroShikra, Accipiter badiusLevant sparrowhawk, Accipiter brevipes (A)
Little sparrowhawk, Accipiter minullus (A)
Eurasian sparrowhawk, Accipiter nisusRufous-breasted sparrowhawk, Accipiter rufiventrisBlack goshawk, Accipiter melanoleucus (A)
Black kite, Milvus migransAfrican fish-eagle, Haliaeetus vociferCommon buzzard, Buteo buteoLong-legged buzzard, Buteo rufinusAugur buzzard, Buteo augurBarn-owls
Order: StrigiformesFamily: Tytonidae

Barn-owls are medium to large owls with large heads and characteristic heart-shaped faces. They have long strong legs with powerful talons. 

Barn owl, Tyto albaOwls
Order: StrigiformesFamily: Strigidae

The typical owls are small to large solitary nocturnal birds of prey. They have large forward-facing eyes and ears, a hawk-like beak and a conspicuous circle of feathers around each eye called a facial disk. 

Eurasian scops-owl, Otus scopsAfrican scops-owl, Otus senegalensisNorthern white-faced owl, Ptilopsis leucotisPharaoh eagle-owl, Bubo ascalaphusCape eagle-owl, Bubo capensisGrayish eagle-owl, Bubo cinerascensVerreaux's eagle-owl, Bubo lacteusPel's fishing-owl, Scotopelia peliPearl-spotted owlet, Glaucidium perlatumLittle owl, Athene noctuaShort-eared owl, Asio flammeusMousebirds
Order: ColiiformesFamily: Coliidae

The mousebirds are slender greyish or brown birds with soft, hairlike body feathers and very long thin tails. They are arboreal and scurry through the leaves like rodents in search of berries, fruit and buds. They are acrobatic and can feed upside down. All species have strong claws and reversible outer toes. They also have crests and stubby bills. 

Speckled mousebird, Colius striatusBlue-naped mousebird, Urocolius macrourusTrogons
Order: TrogoniformesFamily: Trogonidae

The family Trogonidae includes trogons and quetzals. Found in tropical woodlands worldwide, they feed on insects and fruit, and their broad bills and weak legs reflect their diet and arboreal habits. Although their flight is fast, they are reluctant to fly any distance. Trogons have soft, often colourful, feathers with distinctive male and female plumage. 

Narina trogon, Apaloderma narinaHoopoes
Order: BucerotiformesFamily: Upupidae

Hoopoes have black, white and orangey-pink colouring with a large erectile crest on their head.

Eurasian hoopoe, Upupa epops (A)

Woodhoopoes and scimitarbills
Order: BucerotiformesFamily: Phoeniculidae

The woodhoopoes are related to the kingfishers, rollers and hoopoes. They most resemble the hoopoes with their long curved bills, used to probe for insects, and short rounded wings. However, they differ in that they have metallic plumage, often blue, green or purple, and lack an erectile crest.

Black-billed woodhoopoe, Phoeniculus somaliensisBlack scimitarbill, Rhinopomastus aterrimusGround-hornbills
Order: BucerotiformesFamily: Bucorvidae

The ground-hornbills are terrestrial birds which feed almost entirely on insects, other birds, snakes, and amphibians.

Abyssinian ground-hornbill, Bucorvus abyssinicusHornbills
Order: BucerotiformesFamily: Bucerotidae

Hornbills are a group of birds whose bill is shaped like a cow's horn, but without a twist, sometimes with a casque on the upper mandible. Frequently, the bill is brightly coloured.

Hemprich's hornbill, Lophoceros hemprichiiAfrican gray hornbill, Lophoceros nasutusEastern yellow-billed hornbill, Tockus flavirostrisNorthern red-billed hornbill, Tockus erythrorhynchusSilvery-cheeked hornbill, Bycanistes brevis (A)

Kingfishers
Order: CoraciiformesFamily: Alcedinidae

Kingfishers are medium-sized birds with large heads, long, pointed bills, short legs and stubby tails. 

Half-collared kingfisher, Alcedo semitorquataMalachite kingfisher, Corythornis cristatusAfrican pygmy kingfisher, Ispidina pictaGray-headed kingfisher, Halcyon leucocephalaWoodland kingfisher, Halcyon senegalensisStriped kingfisher, Halcyon chelicutiCollared kingfisher, Todirhamphus chlorisGiant kingfisher, Megaceryle maximusPied kingfisher, Ceryle rudisBee-eaters
Order: CoraciiformesFamily: Meropidae

The bee-eaters are a group of near passerine birds in the family Meropidae. Most species are found in Africa but others occur in southern Europe, Madagascar, Australia and New Guinea. They are characterised by richly coloured plumage, slender bodies and usually elongated central tail feathers. All are colourful and have long downturned bills and pointed wings, which give them a swallow-like appearance when seen from afar. 

Red-throated bee-eater, Merops bulocki (A)
Little bee-eater, Merops pusillusEthiopian bee-eater, Merops lafresnayiiWhite-throated bee-eater, Merops albicollisAfrican green bee-eater, Merops viridissimusBlue-cheeked bee-eater, Merops persicusMadagascar bee-eater, Merops superciliosus (A)
European bee-eater, Merops apiasterNorthern carmine bee-eater, Merops nubicusRollers
Order: CoraciiformesFamily: Coraciidae

Rollers resemble crows in size and build, but are more closely related to the kingfishers and bee-eaters. They share the colourful appearance of those groups with blues and browns predominating. The two inner front toes are connected, but the outer toe is not. 

European roller, Coracias garrulusAbyssinian roller, Coracias abyssinicaLilac-breasted roller, Coracias caudata (A)
Rufous-crowned roller, Coracias naeviaBroad-billed roller, Eurystomus glaucurusAfrican barbets
Order: PiciformesFamily: Lybiidae

The African barbets are plump birds, with short necks and large heads. They get their name from the bristles which fringe their heavy bills. Most species are brightly coloured.

Yellow-breasted barbet, Trachyphonus margaritatusRed-fronted tinkerbird, Pogoniulus pusillusBlack-throated barbet, Tricholaema melanocephalaBanded barbet, Lybius undatusVieillot's barbet, Lybius vieillotiBlack-billed barbet, Lybius guifsobalitoHoneyguides
Order: PiciformesFamily: Indicatoridae

Honeyguides are among the few birds that feed on wax. They are named for the greater honeyguide which leads traditional honey-hunters to bees' nests and, after the hunters have harvested the honey, feeds on the remaining contents of the hive.

Lesser honeyguide, Indicator minorGreater honeyguide, Indicator indicatorWoodpeckers
Order: PiciformesFamily: Picidae

Woodpeckers are small to medium-sized birds with chisel-like beaks, short legs, stiff tails and long tongues used for capturing insects. Some species have feet with two toes pointing forward and two backward, while several species have only three toes. Many woodpeckers have the habit of tapping noisily on tree trunks with their beaks.

Eurasian wryneck, Jynx torquillaAbyssinian woodpecker, Chloropicus abyssinicusCardinal woodpecker, Chloropicus fuscescensBrown-backed woodpecker, Chloropicus obsoletusAfrican gray woodpecker, Chloropicus goertaeNubian woodpecker, Campethera nubicaFalcons and caracaras
Order: FalconiformesFamily: Falconidae

Falconidae is a family of diurnal birds of prey. They differ from hawks, eagles and kites in that they kill with their beaks instead of their talons. 

Lesser kestrel, Falco naumanniEurasian kestrel, Falco tinnunculusGreater kestrel, Falco rupicoloidesFox kestrel, Falco alopexGray kestrel, Falco ardosiaceusRed-footed falcon, Falco vespertinus (A)
Eleonora's falcon, Falco eleonorae (A)
Sooty falcon, Falco concolorEurasian hobby, Falco subbuteoLanner falcon, Falco biarmicusSaker falcon, Falco cherrug (A)
Peregrine falcon, Falco peregrinusOld World parrots
Order: PsittaciformesFamily: Psittaculidae

Characteristic features of parrots include a strong curved bill, an upright stance, strong legs, and clawed zygodactyl feet. Many parrots are vividly colored, and some are multi-colored. Old World parrots are found from Africa east across south and southeast Asia and Oceania to Australia and New Zealand.

Rose-ringed parakeet, Psittacula krameriBlack-winged lovebird, Agapornis taranta 

African and New World parrots
Order: PsittaciformesFamily: Psittacidae

Most of the more than 150 species in this family are found in the New World.

Meyer's parrot, Poicephalus meyeriCuckooshrikes
Order: PasseriformesFamily: Campephagidae

The cuckooshrikes are small to medium-sized passerine birds. They are predominantly greyish with white and black, although some species are brightly coloured.

Red-shouldered cuckooshrike, Campephaga phoeniceaOld World orioles
Order: PasseriformesFamily: Oriolidae

The Old World orioles are colourful passerine birds. They are not related to the New World orioles.

Eurasian golden oriole, Oriolus oriolusEthiopian black-headed oriole, Oriolus monachaWattle-eyes and batises
Order: PasseriformesFamily: Platysteiridae

The wattle-eyes, or puffback flycatchers, are small stout passerine birds of the African tropics. They get their name from the brightly coloured fleshy eye decorations found in most species in this group.

Brown-throated wattle-eye, Platysteira cyanea (A)
Gray-headed batis, Batis orientalisWestern black-headed batis, Batis erlangeriVangas, helmetshrikes, and allies
Order: PasseriformesFamily: Vangidae

The helmetshrikes are similar in build to the shrikes, but tend to be colourful species with distinctive crests or other head ornaments, such as wattles, from which they get their name. 

White helmetshrike, Prionops plumatusBushshrikes and allies
Order: PasseriformesFamily: Malaconotidae

Bushshrikes are similar in habits to shrikes, hunting insects and other small prey from a perch on a bush. Although similar in build to the shrikes, these tend to be either colourful species or largely black; some species are quite secretive. 

Brubru, Nilaus aferNorthern puffback, Dryoscopus gambensisBlack-crowned tchagra, Tchagra senegalaEthiopian boubou, Laniarius aethiopicusBlack-headed gonolek, Laniarius erythrogasterRosy-patched bushshrike, Rhodophoneus cruentusGray-headed bushshrike, Malaconotus blanchotiDrongos
Order: PasseriformesFamily: Dicruridae

The drongos are mostly black or dark grey in colour, sometimes with metallic tints. They have long forked tails, and some Asian species have elaborate tail decorations. They have short legs and sit very upright when perched, like a shrike. They flycatch or take prey from the ground.

Fork-tailed drongo, Dicrurus adsimilisGlossy-backed drongo, Dicrurus divaricatusMonarch flycatchers
Order: PasseriformesFamily: Monarchidae

The monarch flycatchers are small to medium-sized insectivorous passerines which hunt by flycatching.

African paradise-flycatcher, Terpsiphone viridisShrikes
Order: PasseriformesFamily: Laniidae

Shrikes are passerine birds known for their habit of catching other birds and small animals and impaling the uneaten portions of their bodies on thorns. A typical shrike's beak is hooked, like a bird of prey.

Red-backed shrike, Lanius collurioRed-tailed shrike, Lanius phoenicuroidesIsabelline shrike, Lanius isabellinusGreat gray shrike, Lanius excubitorLesser gray shrike, Lanius minorNorthern fiscal, Lanius humeralisMasked shrike, Lanius nubicusWoodchat shrike, Lanius senatorCrows, jays, and magpies
Order: PasseriformesFamily: Corvidae

The family Corvidae includes crows, ravens, jays, choughs, magpies, treepies, nutcrackers and ground jays. Corvids are above average in size among the Passeriformes, and some of the larger species show high levels of intelligence.

House crow, Corvus splendens (I)
Cape crow, Corvus capensisPied crow, Corvus albusBrown-necked raven, Corvus ruficollisSomali crow, Corvus edithaeFan-tailed raven, Corvus rhipidurusThick-billed raven, Corvus crassirostrisTits, chickadees, and titmice
Order: PasseriformesFamily: Paridae

The Paridae are mainly small stocky woodland species with short stout bills. Some have crests. They are adaptable birds, with a mixed diet including seeds and insects. 

White-winged black-tit, Melaniparus leucomelasWhite-backed black-tit, Melaniparus leuconotusPenduline-tits
Order: PasseriformesFamily: Remizidae

The penduline-tits are a group of small passerine birds related to the true tits. They are insectivores. 

Sennar penduline-tit, Anthoscopus punctifronsLarks
Order: PasseriformesFamily: Alaudidae

Larks are small terrestrial birds with often extravagant songs and display flights. Most larks are fairly dull in appearance. Their food is insects and seeds. There are 91 species worldwide and 11 species which occur in Eritrea.

Greater hoopoe-lark, Alaemon alaudipesDesert lark, Ammomanes desertiChestnut-backed sparrow-lark, Eremopterix leucotisBlack-crowned sparrow-lark, Eremopterix nigricepsHorsfield’s bushlark, Mirafra javanicaBlanford's lark, Calandrella blanfordiGreater short-toed lark, Calandrella brachydactylaBimaculated lark, Melanocorypha bimaculataThekla's lark, Galerida theklaeCrested lark, Galerida cristataAfrican warblers
Order: PasseriformesFamily: Macrosphenidae

African warblers are small to medium-sized insectivores which are found in a wide variety of habitats south of the Sahara.

Northern crombec, Sylvietta brachyuraCisticolas and allies
Order: PasseriformesFamily: Cisticolidae

The Cisticolidae are warblers found mainly in warmer southern regions of the Old World. They are generally very small birds of drab brown or grey appearance found in open country such as grassland or scrub. 

Yellow-bellied eremomela, Eremomela icteropygialisGreen-backed eremomela, Eremomela canescensGreen-backed camaroptera, Camaroptera brachyuraCricket longtail, Spiloptila clamansBuff-bellied warbler, Phyllolais pulchellaGraceful prinia, Prinia gracilisTawny-flanked prinia, Prinia subflavaRed-fronted prinia, Prinia rufifronsSinging cisticola, Cisticola cantansRattling cisticola, Cisticola chinianaRed-pate cisticola, Cisticola ruficepsEthiopian cisticola, Cisticola lugubrisWinding cisticola, Cisticola marginatusStout cisticola, Cisticola robustusCroaking cisticola, Cisticola natalensisSiffling cisticola, Cisticola brachypterusZitting cisticola, Cisticola juncidisDesert cisticola, Cisticola aridulusBlack-backed cisticola, Cisticola eximius (A)
Pectoral-patch cisticola, Cisticola brunnescens 

Reed warblers and allies
Order: PasseriformesFamily: Acrocephalidae

The members of this family are usually rather large for "warblers". Most are rather plain olivaceous brown above with much yellow to beige below. They are usually found in open woodland, reedbeds, or tall grass. The family occurs mostly in southern to western Eurasia and surroundings, but it also ranges far into the Pacific, with some species in Africa.

Booted warbler, Iduna caligata (A)
Sykes's warbler, Iduna rama (A)
Eastern olivaceous warbler, Iduna pallidaUpcher's warbler, Hippolais languidaOlive-tree warbler, Hippolais olivetorum (A)
Icterine warbler, Hippolais icterina (A)
Sedge warbler, Acrocephalus schoenobaenusMarsh warbler, Acrocephalus palustrisCommon reed warbler, Acrocephalus scirpaceusBasra reed warbler, Acrocephalus griseldis (A)
Great reed warbler, Acrocephalus arundinaceusClamorous reed warbler, Acrocephalus stentoreusGrassbirds and allies
Order: PasseriformesFamily: Locustellidae

Locustellidae are a family of small insectivorous songbirds found mainly in Eurasia, Africa, and the Australian region. They are smallish birds with tails that are usually long and pointed, and tend to be drab brownish or buffy all over.

Savi's warbler, Locustella luscinioidesCommon grasshopper-warbler, Locustella  naeviaSwallows
Order: PasseriformesFamily: Hirundinidae

The family Hirundinidae is adapted to aerial feeding. They have a slender streamlined body, long pointed wings and a short bill with a wide gape. The feet are adapted to perching rather than walking, and the front toes are partially joined at the base.

Plain martin, Riparia paludicolaBank swallow, Riparia ripariaBanded martin, Neophedina cinctaEurasian crag-martin, Ptyonoprogne rupestris (A)
Rock martin, Ptyonoprogne fuligulaBarn swallow, Hirundo rusticaEthiopian swallow, Hirundo aethiopicaWire-tailed swallow, Hirundo smithiiRed-rumped swallow, Cecropis dauricaLesser striped swallow, Cecropis abyssinicaCommon house-martin, Delichon urbicumBlack sawwing, Psalidoprocne pristopteraBulbuls
Order: PasseriformesFamily: Pycnonotidae

Bulbuls are medium-sized songbirds. Some are colourful with yellow, red or orange vents, cheeks, throats or supercilia, but most are drab, with uniform olive-brown to black plumage. Some species have distinct crests. 

Common bulbul, Pycnonotus barbatusLeaf warblers
Order: PasseriformesFamily: Phylloscopidae

Leaf warblers are a family of small insectivorous birds found mostly in Eurasia and ranging into Wallacea and Africa. The species are of various sizes, often green-plumaged above and yellow below, or more subdued with greyish-green to greyish-brown colours.

Wood warbler, Phylloscopus sibilatrix (A)
Eastern Bonelli's warbler, Phylloscopus orientalisWillow warbler, Phylloscopus trochilusCommon chiffchaff, Phylloscopus collybitaBrown woodland-warbler, Phylloscopus umbrovirensSylviid warblers, parrotbills, and allies
Order: PasseriformesFamily: Sylviidae

The family Sylviidae is a group of small insectivorous passerine birds. They mainly occur as breeding species, as the common name implies, in Europe, Asia and, to a lesser extent, Africa. Most are of generally undistinguished appearance, but many have distinctive songs. 

Eurasian blackcap, Sylvia atricapillaGarden warbler, Sylvia borinBarred warbler, Curruca nisoriaLesser whitethroat, Curruca currucaArabian warbler, Curruca leucomelaenaEastern Orphean warbler, Curruca crassirostrisAsian desert warbler, Curruca nanaMenetries's warbler, Curruca mystaceaGreater whitethroat, Curruca communisWhite-eyes, yuhinas, and allies
Order: PasseriformesFamily: Zosteropidae

The white-eyes are small and mostly undistinguished, their plumage above being generally some dull colour like greenish-olive, but some species have a white or bright yellow throat, breast or lower parts, and several have buff flanks. As their name suggests, many species have a white ring around each eye.

Abyssinian white-eye, Zosterops abyssinicusHeuglin's white-eye, Zosterops poliogastrusNorthern yellow white-eye, Zosterops senegalensisLaughingthrushes and allies
Order: PasseriformesFamily: Leiothrichidae

The laughingthrushes are somewhat diverse in size and colouration, but are characterised by soft fluffy plumage.

Fulvous chatterer, Argya fulvaWhite-rumped babbler, Turdoides leucopygiaCretzschmar's babbler, Turdoides leucocephalaOxpeckers
Order: PasseriformesFamily: Buphagidae

As both the English and scientific names of these birds imply, they feed on ectoparasites, primarily ticks, found on large mammals.

Red-billed oxpecker, Buphagus erythrorynchusYellow-billed oxpecker, Buphagus africanusStarlings
Order: PasseriformesFamily: Sturnidae

Starlings are small to medium-sized passerine birds. Their flight is strong and direct and they are very gregarious. Their preferred habitat is fairly open country. They eat insects and fruit. Plumage is typically dark with a metallic sheen. 

Wattled starling, Creatophora cinereaViolet-backed starling, Cinnyricinclus leucogasterSlender-billed starling, Onychognathus tenuirostrisRed-winged starling, Onychognathus morioWhite-billed starling, Onychognathus albirostrisSomali starling, Onychognathus blythiiRüppell's starling, Lamprotornis purpuropterusChestnut-bellied starling, Lamprotornis pulcherLesser blue-eared starling, Lamprotornis chloropterusGreater blue-eared starling, Lamprotornis chalybaeusThrushes and allies
Order: PasseriformesFamily: Turdidae

The thrushes are a group of passerine birds that occur mainly in the Old World. They are plump, soft plumaged, small to medium-sized insectivores or sometimes omnivores, often feeding on the ground. Many have attractive songs.

Groundscraper thrush, Turdus litsitsirupaSong thrush, Turdus philomelosAbyssinian thrush, Turdus abyssinicusAfrican thrush, Turdus peliosOld World flycatchers
Order: PasseriformesFamily: Muscicapidae

Old World flycatchers are a large group of small passerine birds native to the Old World. They are mainly small arboreal insectivores. The appearance of these birds is highly varied, but they mostly have weak songs and harsh calls.

African dusky flycatcher, Muscicapa adustaSpotted flycatcher, Muscicapa striataPale flycatcher, Agricola pallidusNorthern black-flycatcher, Melaenornis edolioidesAbyssinian slaty-flycatcher, Melaenornis chocolatinusRufous-tailed scrub-robin, Cercotrichas galactotesRufous-tailed rock-thrush, Monticola saxatilisBlack scrub-robin, Cercotrichas podobeRüppell's robin-chat, Cossypha semirufaWhite-throated robin, Irania gutturalisThrush nightingale, Luscinia luscinia (A)
Common nightingale, Luscinia megarhynchos (A)
Bluethroat, Luscinia svecicaSemicollared flycatcher, Ficedula semitorquataCommon redstart, Phoenicurus phoenicurusBlack redstart, Phoenicurus ochrurosLittle rock-thrush, Monticola rufocinereusRufous-tailed rock-thrush, Monticola saxatilisBlue rock-thrush, Monticola solitariusWhinchat, Saxicola rubetraSiberian stonechat, Saxicola maurusMoorland chat, Pinarochroa sordida (A)
Mocking cliff-chat, Thamnolaea cinnamomeiventrisWhite-winged cliff-chat, Thamnolaea semirufaRüppell's chat, Myrmecocichla melaena 
Northern wheatear, Oenanthe oenantheRusty-breasted wheatear, Oenanthe frenata (A)
Isabelline wheatear, Oenanthe isabellinaHeuglin's wheatear, Oenanthe heuglini (A)
Desert wheatear, Oenanthe desertiEastern black-eared wheatear, Oenanthe melanoleucaPied wheatear, Oenanthe pleschankaWhite-fronted black-chat, Oenanthe albifronsBlackstart, Oenanthe melanuraFamiliar chat, Oenanthe familiaris (A)
Brown-tailed chat, Oenanthe scotocercaWhite-crowned wheatear, Oenanthe leucopygaAbyssinian wheatear, Oenanthe lugubrisKurdish wheatear, Oenanthe xanthoprymna (A)
Persian wheatear, Oenanthe chrysopygiaHypocolius
Order: PasseriformesFamily: Hypocoliidae

The grey hypocolius is a small Middle Eastern bird with the shape and soft plumage of a waxwing. They are mainly a uniform grey colour except the males have a black triangular mask around their eyes.

Hypocolius, Hypocolius ampelinusSunbirds and spiderhunters
Order: PasseriformesFamily: Nectariniidae

The sunbirds and spiderhunters are very small passerine birds which feed largely on nectar, although they will also take insects, especially when feeding young. Flight is fast and direct on their short wings. Most species can take nectar by hovering like a hummingbird, but usually perch to feed.

Nile Valley sunbird, Hedydipna metallicaScarlet-chested sunbird, Chalcomitra senegalensisTacazze sunbird, Nectarinia tacazzeBeautiful sunbird, Cinnyris pulchellusMariqua sunbird, Cinnyris mariquensisShining sunbird, Cinnyris habessinicusVariable sunbird, Cinnyris venustusWeavers and allies
Order: PasseriformesFamily: Ploceidae

The weavers are small passerine birds related to the finches. They are seed-eating birds with rounded conical bills. The males of many species are brightly coloured, usually in red or yellow and black, some species show variation in colour only in the breeding season.

White-billed buffalo-weaver, Bubalornis albirostrisSpeckle-fronted weaver, Sporopipes frontalisChestnut-crowned sparrow-weaver, Plocepasser superciliosusRed-headed weaver, Anaplectes rubriceps (A)
Baglafecht weaver, Ploceus baglafechtLittle weaver, Ploceus luteolusRüppell's weaver, Ploceus galbulaVillage weaver, Ploceus cucullatusBlack-headed weaver, Ploceus melanocephalusChestnut weaver, Ploceus rubiginosusRed-billed quelea, Quelea queleaNorthern red bishop, Euplectes franciscanusYellow-mantled widowbird, Euplectes macrouraRed-cowled widowbird, Euplectes laticaudaWaxbills and allies
Order: PasseriformesFamily: Estrildidae

The estrildid finches are small passerine birds of the Old World tropics and Australasia. They are gregarious and often colonial seed eaters with short thick but pointed bills. They are all similar in structure and habits, but have wide variation in plumage colours and patterns.

African silverbill, Euodice cantansYellow-bellied waxbill, Estrilda quartiniaBlack-rumped waxbill, Estrilda troglodytesCrimson-rumped waxbill, Estrilda rhodopygaQuailfinch, Ortygospiza atricollisCut-throat, Amadina fasciataRed-cheeked cordonbleu, Uraeginthus bengalusGreen-winged pytilia, Pytilia melbaRed-billed firefinch, Lagonosticta senegalaAfrican firefinch, Lagonosticta rubricataIndigobirds
Order: PasseriformesFamily: Viduidae

The indigobirds are finch-like species which usually have black or indigo predominating in their plumage. All are brood parasites, which lay their eggs in the nests of estrildid finches.

Pin-tailed whydah, Vidua macrouraSahel paradise-whydah, Vidua orientalisVillage indigobird, Vidua chalybeataOld World sparrows
Order: PasseriformesFamily: Passeridae

Old World sparrows are small passerine birds. In general, sparrows tend to be small, plump, brown or grey birds with short tails and short powerful beaks. Sparrows are seed eaters, but they also consume small insects. 

House sparrow, Passer domesticus (I)
Northern gray-headed sparrow, Passer griseusSwainson's sparrow, Passer swainsoniiSudan golden-sparrow, Passer luteusYellow-spotted bush sparrow, Gymnoris pyrgitaSahel bush sparrow, Gymnoris dentataPale rockfinch, Carpospiza brachydactylaWagtails and pipits
Order: PasseriformesFamily: Motacillidae

Motacillidae is a family of small passerine birds with medium to long tails. They include the wagtails, longclaws and pipits. They are slender, ground feeding insectivores of open country. 

Mountain wagtail, Motacilla clara (A)
Gray wagtail, Motacilla cinereaWestern yellow wagtail, Motacilla flavaAfrican pied wagtail, Motacilla aguimpWhite wagtail, Motacilla albaAfrican pipit, Anthus cinnamomeusLong-billed pipit, Anthus similisTawny pipit, Anthus campestrisPlain-backed pipit, Anthus leucophrysTree pipit, Anthus trivialisRed-throated pipit, Anthus cervinusFinches, euphonias, and allies
Order: PasseriformesFamily: Fringillidae

Finches are seed-eating passerine birds, that are small to moderately large and have a strong beak, usually conical and in some species very large. All have twelve tail feathers and nine primaries. These birds have a bouncing flight with alternating bouts of flapping and gliding on closed wings, and most sing well.

Trumpeter finch, Bucanetes githagineus (A)
White-rumped seedeater, Crithagra leucopygiusYellow-fronted canary, Crithagra mozambicusAfrican citril, Crithagra citrinelloidesYellow-rumped serin, Crithagra xanthopygiusStreaky seedeater, Crithagra striolatusBrown-rumped seedeater, Crithagra tristriatusYellow-crowned canary, Serinus flavivertexOld World buntings
Order: PasseriformesFamily: Emberizidae

The emberizids are a large family of passerine birds. They are seed-eating birds with distinctively shaped bills. Many emberizid species have distinctive head patterns.

Cinereous bunting, Emberiza cineraceaOrtolan bunting, Emberiza hortulanaCretzschmar's bunting, Emberiza caesiaGolden-breasted bunting, Emberiza flaviventrisCinnamon-breasted bunting, Emberiza tahapisiStriolated bunting, Emberiza striolata''

See also
List of birds
Lists of birds by region

References

References

External links
Birds of Eritrea - World Institute for Conservation and Environment

Eritrea
Eritrea
Birds
Eritrea